Theatre New Brunswick is the only professional theatre company in New Brunswick, Canada. It began operation in 1968, and has been successfully operating since that time. TNB celebrated its 50th Anniversary in 2018.

The following is a chronological list of the productions that have been staged since its inception.

1968
Little Hut – by André Roussin
Any Wednesday – by Muriel Resnik
Springtime for Henry – by Benn W. Levy
Barefoot in the Park – by Neil Simon

1969
The Marriage-Go-Round – by Leslie Stevens
Inadmissible Evidence – by John Osborne
Boeing Boeing – by Marc Camoletti
The Glass Menagerie – by Tennessee Williams
The Importance of Being Earnest – by Oscar Wilde
Gaslight – by Patrick Hamilton
Star Spangled Girl – by Neil Simon
See How They Run – by Philip King
Dick Whittington – by Nicholas Pegg

1970
Two for the Seesaw – by William Gibson
There's a Girl in My Soup – by Terence Frisby
Who's Afraid of Virginia Woolf? – by Edward Albee
Black Comedy – by Peter Shaffer
A Resounding Tinkle – by N. F. Simpson
Private Lives – by Noël Coward
Mary, Mary – by Jean Kerr
Dial M for Murder – by Frederick Knott
Critic's Choice – by Ira Levin
Please Don't Sneeze

1971
A Man for All Seasons – by Robert Bolt
The Mousetrap – by Agatha Christie
The Playboy of the Western World – by J. M. Synge
Plaza Suite – by Neil Simon

1972
Butterflies Are Free – by Leonard Gershe
The Country Girl – by Clifford Odets
Philadelphia, Here I Come! – by Brian Friel
The King and I – by Richard Rodgers and Oscar Hammerstein II
The Lion in Winter – by James Goldman
Present Laughter – by Noël Coward
The Secretary Bird – by William Douglas-Home

1973
How the Other Half Loves – by Alan Ayckbourn
Leaving Home – by David French
The Caretaker – by Harold Pinter
Dracula – by Hamilton Deane
The Patrick Pearse Motel – by Hugh Leonard
Jacques Brel Is Alive and Well and Living in Paris – by Jacques Brel
Othello – by William Shakespeare

1974
Death of a Salesman – by Arthur Miller
Who Killed Santa Claus? – by Terence Feely
Born Yesterday – by Garson Kanin
The Fantasticks – music by Harvey Schmidt, lyrics by Tom Jones
Frankenstein – The Man Who Would Be God
The Fourposter – by Jan de Hartog
Head, Guts and Soundbone Dance – by Michael Cook

1975
The School for Scandal – by Richard Brinsley Sheridan
Godspell – by Stephen Schwartz and John-Michael Tebelak
Sleuth – by Anthony Shaffer
The Man Most Likely To
The Innocents – by William Archibald
A Flea in Her Ear – by Georges Feydeau
Frankenstein – adapted by Alden Nowlan and Walter Learning
No Name
The Island – by Athol Fugard, John Kani, and Winston Ntshona
Radisson
The Secret in the Woods or Oedipus Overcome

1976
The Servant of Two Masters – by Carlo Goldoni
The Diary of Anne Frank – by Frances Goodrich and Albert Hackett
Godspell – by Stephen Schwartz and John-Michael Tebelak
Relatively Speaking – by Alan Ayckbourn
Wait Until Dark – by Frederick Knott
Last of the Red Hot Lovers – by Neil Simon
Daughter-in-law – by D. H. Lawrence
The Mysterious Stranger
Gilgamesh
Dr. Mildew's Marvelous Magical Musical Medicine Show

1977
The Dollar Woman – by Alden Nowlan and Walter Learning
The Taming of the Shrew – by William Shakespeare
The Price – by Arthur Miller
Made in Heaven – by Georges Feydeau
One Night Stand
Equus – by Peter Shaffer
The Vanishing Village
Dr. Mildew's Marvellous Magical Musical Medicine Show
Dash Leaves the Theatre

1978
The Incredible Murder of Cardinal Tosca – by Alden Nowlan and Walter Learning
Vanities – by Jack Heifner
Sizwe Banzi Is Dead – by Athol Fugard
The Norman Conquests – by Alan Ayckbourn
Man of La Mancha – book by Dale Wasserman, lyrics by Joe Darion, music by Mitch Leigh
John Gyles: an Indian Experience by Ilkay Silk
A Peaceable People
All-new Dr. Mildew's Marvelous Magical Musical Medicine Show
The Drunkard (or the Dipsomaniac Ameliorated)

1979
The Au Pair Man – by Hugh Leonard
Waiting for Godot – by Samuel Beckett
Macbeth – by William Shakespeare
The Return of A. J. Raffles – by Graham Greene
The Subject Was Roses – by F. D. Gilroy
Same Time, Next Year – by Bernard Slade
18 Wheels – by John MacLachlan Gray
The Clam Made a Face – by Eric Nicol
A Marriage Proposal – by Anton Chekhov
Box and Cox – by John Maddison Morton

1980
Hansel and Gretel – by the Brothers Grimm
On Golden Pond – by Ernest Thompson
Free at Last
Twelfth Night – by William Shakespeare
The Glass Menagerie – by Tennessee Williams
Eight to the Bar – by Stephen Witkin
Alexander's Birthday
Winners (play)
Prejudiced ... Who Me?
A Clean Bill or How to Settle Accounts with a Laundress
The Grandiosos

1980–1981
A Christmas Carol – by Charles Dickens
Billy Bishop Goes to War – by John MacLachlan Gray and Eric Peterson
Chapter Two – by Neil Simon
The Miracle Worker – by William Gibson
The Clown Test
Players
The Area Belle – by William Brough and Andrew Halliday

1981–1982
Talley's Folly – by Lanford Wilson
You're a Good Man, Charlie Brown – music and lyrics by Clark Gesner, book by John Gordon
Murder Game – by Dan Ross
Side by Side by Sondheim
Wuthering Heights – by Emily Brontë
An Astral Voyage
The Home Children
Punch and Judy Show

1982–1983
Memoir
Life with Father – by Lindsay and Crouse, adapted from the book by Clarence Day, Jr.
Mass Appeal – by Bill C. Davis
The Impresario / The Diary of Adam and Eve from the Apple Tree
Arms and the Man – by George Bernard Shaw
The Wheel (play)
Saturday Morning Special
TNB Magic Show

1983–1984
Sinners – by Norm Foster
The Little Sweep
Count Dracula
Duet for One – by Tom Kempinski
Candida – by George Bernard Shaw
New Canadian Kid – by Dennis Foon
The Dark Lady of the Sonnets – by George Bernard Shaw
Bagatelle

1984–1985
The Melville Boys – by Norm Foster
I'll Be Back Before Midnight
Scrooge
A Taste of Honey – by Shelagh Delaney
Country Hearts – by Ted Johns and John Roby
Little Victories / Les Petits Pouvoirs
Maritime Mixed Grill
Freshet

1985–1986
Garrison's Garage
Can't Pay? Won't Pay!
Female Transport
The Mystery of the Oak Island Treasure – by Jim Betts
The Tomorrow Box – by Anne Chislett
The White Dogs of Texas
Family Trappings
Lucien – by Marshall Button
Don Messer's Jubilee
Buzzed
The Boogeyman Blues

1986–1987
Jitters – by David French
The Best of Tap
Zero Hour! – by Arthur Hailey
The Little Foxes – by Lillian Hellman
Educating Rita – by Willy Russell
A Child Is Crying on the Stairs
The Black Bonspiel of Wullie MacCrimmon – by W. O. Mitchell
Peacemaker
How I Wonder What You Are
The Lion, the Witch and the Wardrobe – by C. S. Lewis

1987–1988
My Darling Judith – by Norm Foster
Guys and Dolls – music and lyrics by Frank Loesser, book by Jo Swerling and Abe Burrows
McClure
Lucien – by Marshall Button
The Corn Is Green – by Emlyn Williams
Corpse!
My Memories of You
Lockhartville
The Late Great Date
I Am a Bear!

1988–1989
Blood Relations – by Sharon Pollock
Scapino!
The Road to Mecca – by Athol Fugard
Agnes of God – by John Pielmeier
The Kite
The Faith Healer
You Strike the Woman, You Strike the Rock
Getting it Straight
Judge Prouse Presiding
The Second City
The Odyssey – by Derek Walcott
Skin

1989–1990
Crimes of the Heart – by Beth Henley
Salt-Water Moon – by David French
A Moon for the Misbegotten – by Eugene O'Neill
Loot – by Joe Orton
Memories of You
Four the Moment
The Second City
Mainline / Lifeline
Journeys

1990–1991
The Affections of May – by Norm Foster
A Christmas Carol – by Charles Dickens
Bordertown Café – by Kelly Rebar
Ghosts – by Henrik Ibsen
Letter from Wingfield Farm – by Dan Needles
Holy Ozone Trashman
Blue Days at Sea

1991–1992
The Motor Trade
Dracula – by Hamilton Deane
Gunmetal Blues – by Marion Adler and Scott Wentworth
The Secret Rapture
Wingfield's Progress
Coming Around

1992–1993
Wrong for Each Other
The Winter's Tale – by William Shakespeare
Cat on a Hot Tin Roof – by Tennessee Williams
Italian American Reconciliation
Wingfield's Folly
Night Light
Best All Around

1993–1994
Lucien 2
The Secret Garden
A Streetcar Named Desire – by Tennessee Williams
Safe Haven – by Mary-Colin Chisholm
Shirley Valentine – by Willy Russell
Head a Tête
How I Wonder What You Are

1994–1995
Yard Sale
A Christmas Carol – by Charles Dickens
If We Are Women – by Joanna McClelland Glass
The Importance of Being Earnest – by Oscar Wilde
The Search for Signs of Intelligent Life in the Universe
Letter from Wingfield Farm – by Dan Needles
Alligator Pie
Lovers & Clowns

1995–1996
I'll Be Back Before Midnight
Steel Magnolias – by Robert Harling
A Gift to Last – by Gordon Pinsent, adapted by Alden Nowlan and Walter Learning
The Gin Game – by D. L. Coburn
Rock and Roll – by John MacLachlan Gray
Lend Me a Tenor – by Ken Ludwig
Charlotte's Web – by E. B. White
A Marriage Proposal – by Anton Chekhov

1996–1997
Office Hours
Kringle's Window
Misery
The Americans Are Coming
Billy Bishop Goes to War – by John MacLachlan Gray and Eric Peterson
The Velveteen Rabbit – by Margery Williams
The Bishop's Candlesticks

1997–1998
Beauty and the Beast – by Warren Graves
Thirteen Hands – by Carol Shields
The Wild Guys
Sleuth – by Anthony Shaffer
The Short Tree and the Bird That Could Not Sing
The Late Great Date

1998–1999
Driving Miss Daisy – by Alfred Uhry
Peter Pan – by J. M. Barrie
The Foursome
Skylight – by David Hare
The Last Tasmanian
The Assignments are Murder
The Hullabaloo Bugaboo Day

1999–2000
The Woman in Black – by Susan Hill
A Christmas Carol – by Charles Dickens
Drinking Alone
The Passion of Narcisse Mondoux – by Gratien Gélinas
I Do! I Do! – book and lyrics by Tom Jones, music by Harvey Schmidt
Beo's Bedroom
Closer to Home
Big

2000–2001
Song for a New World
Ethan Clamore
The Attic, the Pearls and Three Fine Girls
The Drawer Boy – by Michael Healey
Wingfield Unbound – by Dan Needles
The Princess and the Handmaiden
The Compleat Wrks of Wllm Shkspr – by Jess Borgeson, Adam Long and Daniel Singer
Grease – by Jim Jacobs and Warren Casey

2001–2002
Picasso at the Lapin Agile – by Steve Martin
Anne – adapted for the stage by Paul Ledoux
The Prisoner of Second Avenue – by Neil Simon
Late Shift
A Time for Magic

2002–2003
The Secret Garden – by Frances Hodgson Burnett
'Art' – by Yasmina Reza
Jasper Station – book and lyrics by Norm Foster, music and lyrics by Steve Thomas
Danny King of the Basement
Mirror Game
Hello, Dolly! – lyrics and music by Jerry Herman, book by Michael Stewart
A Midsummer Night's Dream – by William Shakespeare

2003–2004
The Hobbit – by J. R. R. Tolkien
Dear Santa
Vinci – by Maureen Hunter
Wingfield on Ice – by Dan Needles
Zak and the Magic Blue Stones
I Met a Bully on the Hill
Secrets
Chicago

2004–2005
Chairmaker
The Cricket on the Hearth – by Charles Dickens
Mary's Wedding
Oh, Coward!
Lucien Snowbird
Lig and Bittle
Two Weeks Twice a Year
Wrecked
A Chorus Line – by Michael Bennett

2005–2006
Here on the Flight Path
Pinocchio – by Brian Way
I Love You, You're Perfect, Now Change
For the Pleasure of Seeing Her Again
The Lion, the Witch and the Wardrobe – by C. S. Lewis
Passing Through
Cats – by Andrew Lloyd Webber, poems by T. S. Eliot

2006–2007
The Graduate – by Charles Webb
For Art's Sake
Smokescreen
The Sound of Music – by Richard Rodgers and Oscar Hammerstein II
Aladdin Jr.
The Legend of Sleepy Hollow – by Washington Irving

2007–2008
Forever Plaid – by Stuart Ross
A Christmas Carol – by Charles Dickens
The Love List
Chasing the Money
The Sorcerer's Apprentice
Beauty and the Beast – by Linda Woolverton
Charlie and the Chocolate Factory – by Roald Dahl
Oklahoma! – by Oscar Hammerstein II and Richard Rodgers

2008–2009
The Rocky Horror Show – by Richard O'Brien
Narnia – by C. S. Lewis
Tuesdays with Morrie – by Mitch Albom
Guys and Dolls – by Abe Burrows and Jo Swerling
Oliver Twist – by Charles Dickens
The Secret Garden – by Frances Hodgson Burnett

2009–2010
Doubt A Parable – by John Patrick Shanley
It's A Wonderful Life – by Philip Grecian
Skin Flick – by Norm Foster
The Bricklin: An Automotive Fantasy
Annie – by Thomas Meehan
Dear Edwina – by Marcy Heisler
Alice in Wonderland – by Lewis Carroll

2010–2011
Feelgood
Treasure Island – by Robert Louis Stevenson
Hockey Dreams – by David Adams Richards
The Bricklin: An Automotive Fantasy
Les Misérables – by Claude-Michel Schönberg and Alain Boublil
Our Town – by Thornton Wilder
Bugsy Malone – by Alan Parker and Paul Williams

2011–2012
A Doll's House – by Henrik Ibsen
The 39 Steps – by Alfred Hitchcock
The Gifts of the Magi – by O. Henry
The Dollar Woman – by Norm Foster and Alden Nowlan
The Musical of Musicals (The Musical!) – by Joanne Bogart and Eric Rockwell
The Wizard of Oz – by L. Frank Baum
The Pirates of Penzance – by Sir Arthur Sullivan
The Chocolate War – by Robert Cormier

2012–2013
Oleanna – by David Mamet
Hilda's Yard – by Norm Foster
It's a Wonderful Life – by Philip Grecian
Little Shop of Horrors – by Howard Ashman
West Side Story – by Arthur Laurents
The Little Mermaid – by Doug Wright
Peter Pan – by J. M. Barrie

2013–2014
RED – by John Logan
The Net, a Tragedy of the Sea – by Marcel-Romain Theriault
Private Lives – by Noël Coward
The Last Five Years – by Jason Robert Brown
Guys and Dolls – by Abe Burrows and Jo Swerling
Thoroughly Modern Millie Jr. – by Jeanine Tesori
Lilly Alta. – by Ken Dylba

2014–2015
Frankenstein, The Man Who Became God – by Walter Learning and Alden Nowlan
A Christmas Carol – by Charles Dickens, adapted by Caleb Marshall, Michael Doherty, and Tania Breen
On a First Name Basis – by Norm Foster
Beaverbrook – by David Adams Richards
The Indigenous Peoples Project
Somme Letters Home – Letters of Private John Bapst Cronin
The Drowsy Chaperone – by Don McKellar and Bob Martin
The Sound of Music – by Oscar Hammerstein II and Richard Rodgers

2015-2016 

 You Play Beautifully - by Thomas Morgan Jones
 Life, Death and the Blues - by Raoul Bhaneja
 Vigil - by Morris Panych
 Watching Glory Die - by Judith Thompson
 Little Women, The Musical - book by Allan Knee, lyrics by Mindi Dickstein, and music by Jason Howland
 The Space Between - by Thomas Morgan Jones
 Returning Fire - by Ryan Griffith
 Marion Bridge - by Daniel MacIvor
 Mary Poppins - music and lyrics by Richard M. Sherman and Robert B. Sherman (aka the Sherman Brothers), with additional music and lyrics by George Stiles and Anthony Drewe, and a script by Julian Fellowes.

2016-2017 

 A Sunday Affair - by Gabrielle Houle, Thomas Morgan Jones and Richard Lee.
 Ghost Light - by Shawn Wright
 The Snow Queen - by Hans Christian Andresen | Adapted by Thomas Morgan Jones 
 The Damsel In Distress Who Saved Herself - by Kira Smith 
 The Boat - Ryan Griffith 
 Shrek, The Musical - Music by Jeanni Tesori | Book and Lyrics by David Lindsay-Abaire

2017-2018 

 Fortune of Wolves - by Ryan Griffith
 A Christmas Carol - by Charles Dickens | Adapted by Thomas Morgan Jones
 A Herman Tale - by Paul McAllister, adapted by Tania Breen
 Goodbye Marianne - by Irene Kirstein Watts
 Finding Wolastoq Voice -  by Natalie Sappier 
 Beauty and the Beast - Music by Alan Menken, Lyrics by Howard Ashman & Tim Rice, Book by Linda Woolverton

2018-2019 

 Any Given Moment - Kim Parkhill
 Come Down From Up River - by Norm Foster (a production from The Foster Festival) 
 The Lion, The Witch and The Wardrobe - C. S. Lewis 
 Gretel & Hansel - Written by Brothers Grimm | Adapted by Thomas Morgan Jones
 Sania The Destroyer - by Mona'a Malik
 A Brief History of the Maritimes and Everywhere Else - by Ryan Griffith 
 The Wizard of Oz - By L. Frank Baum, with Music and Lyrics, by Harold Arlen and E. Y. Harburg, Background Music by Herbert Stothart, Dance and Vocal Arrangements by Peter Howard, Orchestration by Larry Wilcox, Adapted by John Kane for the Royal Shakespeare Company, Based upon the Classic Motion Picture owned by Turner Entertainment Co. and distributed in all media by Warner Bros.

References

External links
Theatre New Brunswick

Canadian theatre company production histories
Theatre in New Brunswick